Argetoaia is a commune in Dolj County, Oltenia, Romania with a population of  4,903 people. It is composed of twelve villages: Argetoaia, Băranu, Berbeșu, Iordăchești, Leordoasa, Malumnic, Novac, Piria, Poiana Fântânii, Salcia, Teascu din Deal and Ursoaia.

References

Communes in Dolj County
Localities in Oltenia